Gustar Junianto (born 14 June 1980) is an Indonesian weightlifter. He competed in the men's featherweight event at the 2004 Summer Olympics.  He won a gold medal at the weightlifting competition at the 2001 Southeast Asian Games, but the award was stripped after he failed a test for the prohibited steroid nandrolone.

References

1980 births
Living people
Indonesian male weightlifters
Olympic weightlifters of Indonesia
Weightlifters at the 2004 Summer Olympics
Place of birth missing (living people)
21st-century Indonesian people